Club Deportivo Canillas is a Spanish football club based in Madrid, Spain. It was founded in 1961 and plays in the Categoría Preferente de Aficionados, the fifth tier of Spanish football. CD Canillas is a feeder team of Real Madrid.

History
Canillas was formed in 1961 in Nápoles, Hortaleza, initially under the name "Club Deportivo Los Merinos". Registered in the Madrid Football Federation in 1969, it was renamed to "Club Deportivo Nápoles" due to regulation rules.

In 1975, the club was renamed to its actual name (Club Deportivo Canillas), achieving its first promotion in 1979. A youth section, "CD EPAYDA", was formed in 1997.

Season-to-season

1 season in Tercera División

Other teams

CD Canillas B and CD Canillas U19 
CD Canillas B, the reserve team of CD Canillas, plays in the Primera Categoría de Aficionados, the sixth tier of Spanish football while CD Canillas U19 plays in Group XII of the Liga Nacional Juvenil.

Women's team 
C.D. Canillas Femenino (now CD Tacón) was bought by Real Madrid.

Notable players

Real Madrid related 
Since CD Canillas is the feeder club of Real Madrid, some players who came from La Fábrica, Real Madrid's youth academy, had played at CD Canillas. Famous footballers' sons have also played there.

 Théo and Elyaz Zidane, sons of Zinedine Zidane
 Ronald Nazário, son of Ronaldo Nazário
 José Mario Mourinho Jr., son of José Mourinho
 Christian Cannavaro, son of Fabio Cannavaro
 Jaime Amaro, grandson of Amancio Amaro
 Benjamín Garay
 Gonzalo Expósito

Others

From CD Canillas youth academy 
 Javier Castro
 Sergey Georgiev

As CD Canillas senior player 
 Jhony
 Nader Matar

References 

CD Canillas
Football clubs in the Community of Madrid
Association football clubs established in 1961
1961 establishments in Spain